The 2005 World Women's Handball Championship, the 17th team handball world championship for women, was played in Saint Petersburg, Russia between 5 and 18 December 2005. Russia won their second title.

Qualification

Preliminary round
All times are local UTC+3.

Group A

Group B

Group C

Group D

Main round

Group I

Group II

Final round

Bracket

Semifinals

Seventh-place game

Fifth-place game

Bronze medal game

Final

Final rankings

Statistics

Top goalscorers

Source: IHF

Top goalkeepers

Source: IHF

All star team
 Goalkeeper: 
 Left wing: 
 Left back: 
 Centre back: 
 Right back: 
 Right wing: 
 Pivot: 
Source: IHF

Medalists

References

External links
 XVII Women's World Championship Russia 2005 – At the official International Handball Federation website

Handball
World Women's Handball Championship
World Women's Handball Championship
World Women's Handball Championship
Handball
World Women's Handball Championship, 2005
Women's handball in Russia
World Handball Championship tournaments